Khalti (also Romanized as Khāltī, Khālţī, and Khālatī; also known as Khālt) is a village in Tudeshk Rural District, Kuhpayeh District, Isfahan County, Isfahan Province, Iran. At the 2006 census, its population was 64, in 21 families.

References 

Populated places in Isfahan County